is a 1975 Japanese documentary film on the life and works of director Kenji Mizoguchi. It was produced, written and directed by Kaneto Shindō.

Synopsis
In 39 interviews with actors and actresses, writers, producers and staff members, interspersed with film excerpts and stills, Shindō recounts the life and career of his friend and mentor Mizoguchi. 

Interviewees

 Masaichi Nagata
 Takako Irie
 Masashige Narusawa
 Eijirō Yanagi
 Dai Arakawa
 Machiko Kyō
 Matsuji Ohno
 Eitaro Ozawa
 Gengo Ohto
 Eitarō Shindō
 Kakuko Mori
 Kumeko Urabe
 Seiichiro Uchikawa
 Tazuko Sakane
 Kyōko Kagawa
 Daisuke Itō
 Motohisa Ando
 Kenichi Okamoto
 Kiyohiko Ushihara
 Tatsuo Sakai
 Eiji Nakano
 Yoshikata Yoda
 Kazuo Miyagawa
 Ayako Wakao
 Yasuzo Masumura
 Fumiko Yamaji
 Tadaoto Kainoshō
 Isuzu Yamada
 Hideo Tsumura
 Matsutarō Kawaguchi
 Toshio Itoya
 Michiyo Kogure
 Shigeru Miki
 Ganjirō Nakamura
 Kinuyo Tanaka
 Yoshikazu Hayashi
 Yoshiyuki Takatsu
 Goro Sodai
 Nobuko Otowa

Awards
Kenji Mizoguchi: The Life of a Film Director received the Kinema Junpo Award for Best Film. Kaneto Shindō received the Kinema Junpo Award and the Mainichi Film Award for Best Director.

Home media
The film was released on DVD in Japan in 2001. In the US, the film is included in the Criterion Collection DVD and Blu-ray release of Ugetsu (1953).

References

Further reading

External links
 

Films directed by Kaneto Shindo
1975 films
1975 documentary films
Japanese documentary films
Documentary films about film directors and producers
Best Film Kinema Junpo Award winners
1970s Japanese films